Hybla Valley is a census-designated place (CDP) in Fairfax County, Virginia, United States, south of Alexandria. The population was 15,801 at the 2010 census, down from 16,721 in 2000 due to a reduction in area, resulting from some of the eastward neighborhoods including much of Hollin Hills being moved to the Fort Hunt CDP.  The population increased to 16,319 in the 2020 census.

History
The Mason family's Hollin Hall plantation, just south of Alexandria, had become the property of several owners, including Edward Curtis Gibbs and the Wilson family. Thomson Dairy had been founded on the land in the late 19th century, and lasted until Merle Thorpe purchased it in the early 20th century. The various dairy farms, such as Sherwood Farm, Hybla Valley Farm, and Popkins Farm were converted into suburban neighborhoods, while plans for the construction of the George Washington Air Junction and the Hybla Valley Airport began. The civilian airport was proposed to be the largest in the world, yet the land, which had once been dairy farm, was abandoned and is currently Huntley Meadows Park. During World War II, the famous Hollin Hills subdivision, to the east of U.S. Route 1 towards the Potomac River, was completed by designers Charles Goodman and Robert Davenport. Also during the war, the princess of Norway sought refuge from the conflict in Europe and wished to purchase the property of Hollin Hall; President Roosevelt personally inspected the land for her, yet his assistant, Thorpe, became its new owner in the end. The land surrounding it became a turkey farm, and was eventually bought by the Mount Vernon Unitarian Church.  In 1978, the Mount Vernon Unitarian Church donated land within Hollin Hills to create the wealthy Mason Hill subdivision. The west side of Hybla Valley has developed over the years, including construction of Mount Vernon Plaza in 2002.

In 1833, Gum Springs was founded by West Ford, a freed slave, skilled carpenter, and manager on George Washington's plantation, Mount Vernon. Ford was able to develop this 214-acre farming community in Fairfax County from the sale of land he inherited from Hanna Washington, the sister-in-law of George Washington. By 1866, Ford was the second richest free black farmer in Fairfax County, Virginia. Gum Springs Farm became the nucleus of an African-American community throughout the 1800s. Gum Springs was established along what is now Route 1 (Richmond Highway) and in 1991 a historical marker was erected from the Department of Historic Resource (Marker Number E-04).

Since the early 2000s, the Hybla Valley area has experienced a significant growth of its Hispanic population. As of the 2010 census, the Hispanic population exceeded the African American population in Hybla Valley.

Geography
Hybla Valley is located in southeastern Fairfax County at  (38.746864, −77.076964). It is bordered by Fort Hunt to the east, Mount Vernon and Woodlawn to the southwest, and Groveton to the west and north. Huntley Meadows Park is to the west within the Groveton CDP, and Little Hunting Creek separates Hybla Valley from Mount Vernon and Woodlawn.

It is characterized by rolling hills, parks, forest, and streams. Paul Springs Valley Stream Park winds past the eastern edge of the community.

Demographics

As of the census of 2020, there were 16,319 people, with 5,639 households, residing in the CDP. The population density was 7,687 people per square mile in 2010, which increased to 7,948.9 people per square mile in 2020. There were 6,157 housing units in 2010 at an average density of 2,018/sq mi. According to the 2020 American Community Survey, the racial makeup of the CDP was 47.8% White, 25.4% African American, 0.0% Native American or Alaskan Native, 10.9% Asian, 0.0% Native Hawaiian or other Pacific Islander and 3.9% from two or more races. Hispanic or Latino of any race were 36.5% of the population.

There were 5,639 households recorded in the 2020 census. The average household size was 3.24 persons.

The age distribution of the CDP's population, according to the 2020 American Community Survey, showed 9.4% under the age of 5, 30.5% under the age of 18 and 11.5% who were 65 years of age or older. Female persons totaled 50.8% of the population.

The median income for a household in the CDP in 2020 dollars between 2016 and 2020 was $56,188  and the per capita income in the past 12 months over the same time period was $27,054.

According to U.S. News, Hybla Valley has a high cost of living and an elevated price of homes in regards to the rest of the nation. Relative to the rest of the United States, crime in Hybla Valley is categorized as low, and the median income is categorized as average.

Education
Fairfax County Public Schools operates public schools.

Fairfax County Public Library operates the Sherwood Regional Library in the CDP.

References

Census-designated places in Fairfax County, Virginia
Census-designated places in Virginia
Washington metropolitan area